Captain Cook  was a merchant ship built at Whitby, England in 1826. She made one voyage to Bombay under a license from the British East India Company (EIC) in 1828. She then made three voyages transporting convicts from Ireland and England to Australia. In August 1843 she was wrecked on her way with a cargo of coal from Shields to Aden.

Career
Captain Cook first appeared in Lloyd's Register (LR) in 1827.

On 28 April 1828 Captain Cook, G.Willis, master, sailed for Bombay.

1st convict voyage (1831–1832): Captain William Steward and surgeon Eben Johnson, departed Dublin, Ireland on 5 November 1831. Captain Cook arrived in Sydney on 2 April 1832. She had embarked 200 male convicts and there were two convict deaths en route. Captain Cook left Port Jackson on 15 May bound for Launceston.

2nd convict voyage (1833): Captain William Thompson and surgeon John Morgan departed Portsmouth, England on 5 May 1833. Captain Cook arrived in Sydney on 26 August 1833. She had embarked 230 male convicts and there were four convict deaths en route. 

3rd convict voyage (1836): Captain George William Brown and surgeon Arthur Savage departed Cork, Ireland on 5 July 1836. Captain Cook arrived in Sydney on 13 November. She had embarked 229 male convicts and had one convict death en route.

Fate
Captain Cook, Finch, master, was lost before 21 August 1843. She was carrying a cargo of 700 tons of coal from Shields to Aden on behalf of the British government. Midas rescued the crew.

Citations

References
 
 
  

1826 ships
Ships built in Whitby
Convict ships to New South Wales
Age of Sail merchant ships
Maritime incidents in August 1843